Shwesettaw Wildlife Sanctuary is a protected area in Myanmar, covering . It was established in 1985.

References

External links

Protected areas of Myanmar
Protected areas established in 1985
Important Bird Areas of Myanmar
1985 establishments in Burma